The Hundred of Rounsevell is a cadastral hundred of the County of Robinson in South Australia. The main town of the hundred is Mortana.

References

Rounsevell